Syriac Catholic cathedral may refer to:

Syria 
 Syriac Catholic Cathedral of Saint Paul, Damascus
 Cathedral of Our Lady of the Assumption, Aleppo

See also 
 Syriac Catholic Church

Buildings and structures disambiguation pages